Michael Akinyemi (born 17 October 1947) is an Anglican bishop in Nigeria: he was the pioneer Bishop of Igbomina, one of seven in the  Anglican Province of Kwara, itself one of 14 within the Church of Nigeria. Akinyemi was also Archbishop of the Anglican Province of Kwara until his retirement in 2017.

Notes

Anglican bishops of Etche
21st-century Anglican bishops in Nigeria
21st-century Anglican archbishops
Anglican bishops of Igbomina
Anglican archbishops of Kwara
Living people
1947 births